Black Mountain is the highest mountain peak in the Commonwealth of Kentucky, United States, with a summit elevation of   above mean sea level and a top-to-bottom height of over . It is alternatively known as Katahrin's Mountain, and is about  taller than any other mountain in Kentucky.

Description

Route 160 east of Lynch and west of Appalachia crosses the mountain. The summit is reached by a narrow road that turns off to the right (coming from Lynch or to the left, if coming from Appalachia) at the Kentucky-Virginia line (the gap that is the highest part of Route 160) and leads past a Federal Aviation Administration radar dome. There is a one lane dirt road to the left not far past the radar dome that leads to the summit. The summit is marked with an abandoned metal fire lookout tower (the cab and wooden steps are missing from the tower). There are also multiple radio towers along with transmitter buildings around the summit and a National Geodetic Survey benchmark is located on a large rock over the hill to the left of the fire tower.

The FAA Radar dome is nearby, but below the summit. Trees on both sides of the radar dome have been cleared, so views of other mountains are visible. On a clear day the Great Smoky Mountains on the Tennessee and North Carolina border are clearly visible.

Black Mountain's history is intimately tied to the coal mining of the surrounding region.  Lynch, Kentucky, was once one of the largest coal mining towns in the nation. In 1998, Jericol Mining, Inc., petitioned to use mountaintop removal methods in the area of Black Mountain. Though the summit itself was not directly threatened, many people protested this action due to the peak's status as the state's highest point. In 1999, Kentucky purchased mineral and timber rights to the summit and prevented future large scale mining. Coal companies have alleged that mined coal veins converge beneath the summit of Black Mountain and that the summit is prone to collapse.

A coal company named Penn Virginia Resources of Radnor, Pennsylvania formerly owned the summit, but allowed public access with the completion of a waiver. Now, however, the Commonwealth of Kentucky owns the land and no waiver is required.

Ecology
Black Mountain is one of the few sites in Kentucky supporting a Northern Hardwood Forest at higher elevations. Numerous rare plants are found here, including Red Elderberry and Hobblebush. Like many areas of Northern Hardwood Forest in Southern Appalachia, fires swept across the mountain after intense logging. Black Mountain has a documented fire that occurred in the fall of 1896.

See also

 List of mountains of Kentucky
 List of U.S. states by elevation

References

External links
 
As shown on the USGS website, this is incorrect. The summit is apparently under the old fire lookout tower.
 Black Mountain Recreation Park

Eastern Kentucky Coalfield
Mountains of Kentucky
Kentucky culture
Landforms of Harlan County, Kentucky
Highest points of U.S. states
North American 1000 m summits